is a Japanese multimedia franchise created by KLab and Kadokawa Corporation. It features a scenario written by Hajime Asano and character designs by U35. It includes a smartphone game for Android and iOS devices, a manga adaptation by Hirochi and Shingo Nagai, novels, music releases, and live events. An anime television series by Yokohama Animation Laboratory aired from July to September 2020.

Characters

LiGHTs

A princess who has come to a magic school to study. She hides her princess status from her friends as she wishes to have a normal school life.

Tiara's childhood friend who is also studying in the magic school.

IV KLORE

A succubus student.

A magic doll.

A werewolf student.

A ghost student.

Konohana wa Otome (この花は乙女)

Sugar Pockets

Sadistic★Candy

A member of Sadistic★Candy. She is actually Angers from Ray.

supernova

Ray

The leader of Ray and Tiara's older sister. 

A member of Ray. Following Ray's disbandment, she became a member of Sadistic★Candy under the name Angelica.

Media

Manga 
A manga by Hiroichi started serialization in the December 2019 issue of Dengeki Daioh, which was released on October 26, 2019.

Anime 
The 12-episode animated series was directed by Hiroyuki Hata at Yokohama Animation Laboratory with Taro Ikegami serving as the chief animation director and character designer. The scripts of the series were overseen by Kasumi Tsuchida and Hajime Asano, and the music was composed by Satoshi Hōno. "Lapis Re:LiGHTs Stars" performed the opening theme , while LiGHTs performed the ending theme .  It aired from July 4 to September 19, 2020 on Tokyo MX and BS11. Funimation acquired the series, and streamed it on its website in North America and the British Isles, and on AnimeLab in Australia and New Zealand.

Episode list

Game 
A free-to-play mobile game developed by KLab for iOS and Android devices was launched on December 14, 2021. It will end service on October 31, 2022.

References

External links
 

Animated musical groups
Android (operating system) games
Crunchyroll anime
Dengeki Daioh
IOS games
Japanese idol groups
Japanese idols in anime and manga
Kadokawa Dwango franchises
Magical girl anime and manga
Music video games
NBCUniversal Entertainment Japan
Shōnen manga
Tokyo MX original programming
Video games developed in Japan
Yokohama Animation Laboratory